Global 6 Cycling is a New Zealand UCI Continental cycling team focusing on road bicycle racing.

Team roster

References

External links
 Twitter

Cycling teams based in New Zealand
Cycling teams established in 2021
2021 establishments in New Zealand
UCI Continental Teams (Oceania)